Jimmy Walsh (July 18, 1883 – November 23, 1964) was an American boxer who claimed the World Bantamweight Championship on March 29, 1905, when he defeated Monte Attell, in a controversial six-round bout at the National Athletic Club in Philadelphia. His claim was recognized by the World Boxing Association, at the time the National Boxing Association. The fight ended in a disqualification called by the referee when Walsh sent a low right hook that landed below the belt of Attell. Most sources believed Walsh had led throughout the fight and that the blow should have been considered legal, which may be why Walsh was credited with the title by the National Boxing Association.

He unsuccessfully challenged Abe Attell twice and Johnny Kilbane once for the world featherweight championship. He was managed through most of his career by Eddie E. Keevin, who also managed Black heavyweight contender Sam Langford.

Early boxing career
Boxing as an amateur as early as 1901, Walsh began boxing professionally around 1902 in the Boston area, winning all but one of his better publicized fights between April 1902 and March 1904.

Walsh fought Albert "Al" Delmont eleven times, winning seven, losing once, and drawing three times. At least five of these meetings were early in his career in 1902, and six of these bouts are recorded in his BoxRec record.

He fought Patsy McKenna twice in November and December 1902 in Boston and then Salem, Massachusetts, drawing in six rounds both times.

His victory against Johnny Sheehan on February 20, 1903, in Boston was booked as the "105 pound championship of the East" and was one of his first eight-round bouts, in an early career that took place almost exclusively at Boston boxing clubs and almost always in six-round bouts.

His bout against Willie Shumaker on March 26, 1903 at the Essex Athletic Club in Boston was billed as the American 105 pound title and ended in a ten-round points decision in his favor, though he was down in the first round.

Walsh's boxing dominance was becoming more apparent by 1904. On March 3, 1904, in a twelve-round bout at the Riverview Athletic Club with Jack Desmond in Lowell, Massachusetts, Walsh's opponent was in a dazed condition by the third round, and it became apparent to those present, Desmond "was not in Walsh's class."  The draw ruling, in the opinion of the Boston Post, was a clear victory for Walsh as they wrote Desmond "nearly collapsed" by the final round.

First World Bantamweight title match
He competed for what could be considered his first shot at the World Bantamweight Title on April 18, 1904, in a twelve-round loss to London-born Brit Digger Stanley in London, billed as the 112 pound world title. Stanley was both the British and European Bantamweight Champion. Walsh met with Digger Stanley again on June 6, 1904, at the National Sporting Club in London in a twenty-round draw. The Wikes-Barre Times recognized the bout as the Bantamweight Championship and noted the purse was $1000. They met again in a fifteen-round draw bout in October 1905, in Chelsea, Massachusetts, with Walsh never defeating Stanley.

Claiming the World Bantamweight Title

On March 29, 1905, Walsh first claimed the World Bantamweight Title in a bout against Monte Attell, brother of champion Abe, in Philadelphia that ended when the referee called a disqualification against Walsh in the sixth round.  One source noted that Walsh, "had the better of the bout from the start", and that the blow which occurred two minutes into the sixth round was accidental. The National Boxing Association recognized Walsh's claim to the Bantamweight Championship.  The St. Louis Dispatch, noted that according to most spectators ringside, the "blow was a fair one", though it was a "terrific right hook", and did notable injury to Attell. Controversy arose as to who won the bout as many observers considered the blow legal, and that "Walsh completely had Attell at his mercy throughout the entire contest."

Monte Attell and Walsh fought again on December 21, 1908, in a fifteen-round draw at the Colliseum in San Francisco.  The bout was not considered a title fight because Walsh was unable to make the agreed upon weight.  The Montreal Gazette noted that Walsh had the better of the last four rounds, with Attell having a slight edge in the first three rounds, but that the boxing was very close for much of the fight.

Losing the World Bantamweight Title
On January 29, 1909, Walsh met Jimmy Reagan at the Dreamland Rink in San Francisco for a twelve-round World Bantamweight Title match.  According to the Oakland Tribune, "Reagan led in every one of the fifteen rounds with Walsh and was entitled to the verdict," though admitting the "title was a very close one."  Joe Woodman, Walsh's own manager, admitted that Walsh had been beaten in eight of the twelve rounds, though it was a surprise to much of the audience who believed that Reagan had been overmatched with Walsh in the days before the fight. Walsh was considered to have a more clever boxing form and finesse, particularly in the early rounds, but Reagan was the aggressor, delivering more blows, and taking the initiative in the final rounds. Reagan was only eighteen at the time of his victory over Walsh and had fought in relatively few major professional bouts.

World Featherweight Championships

Walsh lost to World Featherweight Champion Abe Attell three times in title matches; on September 12, 1907 for a ten-round decision in Indianapolis, on December 7, 1906, in a ten-round TKO in Los Angeles, and on February 22, 1906 for a fifteen-round decision in Chelsea, Massachusetts, in which Attell "badly punished" Walsh.  Not surprisingly, Attell was the odds on favorite for the December 1906 fight.  He met Attell twice in non-title matches on April 3, 1913, in New York in a ten-round loss by decision and on October 24, 1912, in a twelve-round draw in Boston. After the April 3, 1913, New York bout, Walsh's manager Eddie Keevin filed charges against Attell with the New York boxing commission that Attell had used eye gouging against Walsh in their bout.

Non-title fights in later career
In his November 9, 1909, twelve-round draw bout with Tommy O'Toole in Boston, Walsh put O'Toole down for the count of nine in the tenth round. Not surprisingly the Philadelphia Item gave him the newspaper decision.

On January 8, 1910, he fought six rounds to a draw at Pittsburgh's Old City Hall with Patsy Brannigan, though at least one newspaper gave him the decision.

On April 21, 1910, he was defeated by Pal Moore in ten rounds at the Empire Athletic Club in Harlem, New York, at least according to the respected newspaper decision of the New York Times.  Moore was only seventeen at the time. It was a rare loss for Walsh, and according to one source, he lost at least six of the ten rounds. Many of Walsh's losses were to top rated boxers, and Moore had not yet distinguished himself to that extent.  He would defeat Moore in a twelve-round points decision the following month in Boston.

On November 18, 1910, he defeated talented British boxer Sam Keller at New York's Fairmont Athletic club in a ten-round match. Walsh's victory was most clearly secured in the final round when Walsh landed repeated blows to the body. Walsh began showing an advantage by the seventh round.

On November 23, 1910, he lost decisively to Monte Attell, who had recently held the bantamweight championship, in a ten-round match in San Francisco.  Walsh may have been overweight for the bout at 122 pounds, and appeared to have been most effective in the first round.  Attell evaded his opponent with clever footwork and rocked Walsh, in the brutal bout, with blows to the jaw, mouth, and nose.  Walsh was said to have been swinging wildly and ineffectively by the last four rounds.

Attempting World Featherweight Title
He fought Johnny Kilbane in a World Featherweight Title match on May 21, 1912, at the Pilgrim Athletic Club in Boston, Massachusetts, to a twelve-round draw decision. They had previously fought in a non-title match on May 30, 1911, in a twelve-round draw bout in Canton, Ohio, that was characterized as "full of clinches", with neither man "doing much hard work."

They fought for the last time on September 16, 1913, in a twelve-round bout dominated by Kilbane at the Atlas Athletic Association in Boston.  As an important late career bout, Walsh, according to one source fought primarily defensively against the featherweight champion, who probably outweighed him in the bout, as several sources wrote that Kilbane was fighting as a lightweight, heavier than his normal featherweight status. Fighting defensively, one source noted "Walsh did not land half a dozen blows up to the tenth."  As an indication of his cautious boxing technique, most of Walsh's blows were with his left throughout the bout. Only in the twelfth round was Walsh clearly seen as the aggressor, but by the end of the last round Kilbane was observed to have landed more blows than Walsh.  Walsh was losing more frequently at his career neared its end, but was still boxing quality opponents, even if he was fighting cautiously.

On October 4, 1913, he fought the Jewish boxer Eddie Wallace in Brooklyn defeating him in a ten-round newspaper decision.  Wallace was a skilled featherweight who would later meet the great Benny Leonard, Lew Tendler, Freddie Welsh and Johnny Dundee in his career, though without achieving an impressive win loss record.

One of his last bouts was with Johnny Ertle, in Milwaukee, on February 25, 1914, which he lost in an eight-round newspaper decision.

Refereeing Career
From 1920 to 1934, Walsh refereed 186 bouts. Despite never referring a world championship fight, he did referee bouts for world champions such as Battling Battalino, Benny Bass, Sammy Fuller, Charles 'Bud' Taylor, Kid Chocolate, Johnny Jadick, Isadore Schwartz, Fidel LaBarba, Frankie Genaro, Pancho Villa, Mike Ballerino, Johnny Dundee, Pete Latzo, and Kid Williams.

Retirement from boxing
In late 1909, Walsh gave some boxing instruction to Charles Taft, son of President Taft, and to Theodore Roosevelt Jr., son of ex-President Teddy Roosevelt, who had taken boxing at Harvard.  In February 1913, he was giving boxing instruction to the sons of several of Brookline, Massachusetts's wealthiest families.

Walsh retired from the ring in late 1914, having attained an exceptional record with only ten losses by decision in roughly 150 matches.  According to one source, he worked as a head salesman for a cigar firm in Boston after retiring from boxing, and sent a son to the U.S. Naval Academy.

He died on November 23, 1964.

Professional boxing record
All information in this section is derived from BoxRec, unless otherwise stated.

Official record

All newspaper decisions are officially regarded as “no decision” bouts and are not counted in the win/loss/draw column.

Unofficial record

Record with the inclusion of newspaper decisions in the win/loss/draw column.

See also
List of bantamweight boxing champions

References

External links
 
Jimmy Walsh - CBZ Profile

|-

|-

1883 births
1964 deaths
Bantamweight boxers
Boxers from Boston
World bantamweight boxing champions
World boxing champions
American male boxers